The Early Academic Outreach Program (EAOP) was established in 1976 by the University of California (UC) in response to the California State Legislature's recommendation to expand post-secondary opportunities to all of California's students, including those who are first-generation, socio-economically disadvantaged, and English-language learners.  As UC's largest academic preparation program, EAOP assists middle and high school students with academic preparation, admissions requirements, and financial aid requirements for higher education.  The program designs and provides services to foster students' academic development, and delivers those services in partnership with other academic preparation programs, schools, other higher education institutions and community/industry partners.

The program's goal of increased access for educationally disadvantaged students to the University of California is grounded in the philosophy that preparing for success in college is not simply one of many options for young people; it is their right.

Mission
EAOP contributes to the University of California's Student Academic Preparation and Educational Partnerships (SAPEP) mission to raise student achievement and close achievement gaps. The vision of UC's SAPEP programs is to strengthen California's educational system in ways that will promote a vibrant economy by building a highly skilled and creative workforce.

The goal of Student Academic Preparation and Educational Partnerships (SAPEP) is to work in partnership with K-12, the business sector, community organization and other institutions of higher education to raise student achievement levels generally and to close achievement gaps between groups of students throughout the K-20 pipeline so that a higher proportion of California's young people, including those who are first-generation, socioeconomically disadvantaged and English-language learners, are prepared for post-secondary education, pursue graduate and professional school opportunities and/or achieve success in the workplace.

Method

EAOP employs four key program services—academic enrichment, entrance exam preparation, academic advising, and college knowledge—to help students in schools with low college-going rates attain college eligibility and attend college.

Academic advising: EAOP offers individual and group academic advising that helps students complete California's ‘a–g' college-preparatory courses required for UC/CSU admission.
Academic Enrichment: EAOP students improve basic skills, learn advanced high school curriculum and have the opportunity to engage in the intellectual life of the university through study and research.
Entrance Exam Preparation: SAT and ACT preparation workshops and classes familiarize students with test formats, study strategies and test-taking tips, and provide practice with verbal and mathematics questions.
College Knowledge: Students and parents learn about financial aid and scholarships, how to fill out college applications and write effective personal statements. They tour campuses, attend workshops, go on field trips and learn about California's post-secondary education options.

School partnership models

EAOP provides services to middle and high schools through two service models: cohort and whole school.

The EAOP cohort model (grades 7-12) emphasizes continued, progressive and increasingly advanced academic preparation that enables individual students to succeed in challenging courses and achieve their academic goals. All cohort students receive individualized academic advising services, in addition to any other EAOP services.
In the whole-school model (grades 7-12), EAOP delivers services to the entire school through workshops, assemblies, sometimes in partnership with other academic preparation programs. The work is focused on providing information on college knowledge, exam preparation, college entrance requirements, and financial aid.

Scope
EAOP is the largest UC academic preparation program.  The program has offices located on every UC campus and the campuses serve schools within their geographic regions. In the 2006–07 academic year, EAOP served over 42,492 students in the cohort program alone. That year, EAOP served 259 high schools and 131 middle schools in both cohort and whole-school partner models. EAOP further reached over 9,000 families in workshops, college visits and family events.

Student population
The purpose of EAOP is to increase the number of students who have the opportunity to achieve a post-secondary education.

Outcomes
Research shows that EAOP students are more prepared for college than students who do not participate in the program. Independent academic studies and evaluations conducted for California's state legislature show that EAOP students surpass students statewide in terms of coursework and exam completion, UC eligibility, college enrollment and college persistence. For example:

References

External links

Further reading
 
 
 

United States educational programs
Education in California
University of California
Organizations based in California